Carol Campbell Amick is an American Democratic politician from Bedford, Massachusetts. She represented the 5th Middlesex district in the Massachusetts House of Representatives from 1975 to 1977 and served in the Massachusetts Senate from 1977 to 1989.

References

Year of birth missing
Year of death missing
Members of the Massachusetts House of Representatives
Women state legislators in Massachusetts
20th-century American women politicians
20th-century American politicians
People from Bedford, Massachusetts